The 1990 555 Asian Open was a professional ranking snooker tournament that took place between 29 October and 3 November 1990 at the Guangdong TV studios in Guangzhou, China.

Defending champion Stephen Hendry won the tournament by defeating Dennis Taylor 9–3 in the final.


Main draw

References

Asian Open
Snooker in China
Asian Open
Asian Open